Enallagma doubledayi, the Atlantic bluet, is a species of narrow-winged damselfly in the family Coenagrionidae. It is found in the Caribbean and North America.

The IUCN conservation status of Enallagma doubledayi is "least concern", with no immediate threat to the species' survival. The population is stable. The IUCN status was reviewed in 2017.

References

Further reading

External links

 

Coenagrionidae
Odonata of North America
Insects described in 1850
Taxa named by Edmond de Sélys Longchamps
Articles created by Qbugbot